This is a list of broadcast television stations that are licensed in the U.S. Virgin Islands. The U.S. Virgin Islands is home to one of the smallest TV markets as defined by Nielsen market research, with only 5 full-power stations on Saint Thomas and Saint Croix.

Full-power stations
VC refers to the station's PSIP virtual channel. RF refers to the station's physical RF channel.

Defunct full-power stations
Channel 10: WBNB-TV - CBS - Charlotte Amalie, St. Thomas (1961–1989)
Channel 15: WMEG - Religious - Christiansted, St. Croix (1987–1989)
Channel 15: WWCW - Independent - Christiansted, St. Croix (1989–1999)
Channel 15: WVIF - Independent - Christiansted, St. Croix (1999–2009)
Channel 17: WVGI - Independent - Charlotte Amalie, St. Thomas (1987–1995)
Channel 27: WTFM-TV - Independent - Christiansted, St. Croix (1986–1989)
Channel 43: WAIG - Independent - Charlotte Amalie, St. Thomas (1987–1989)

LPTV stations

Defunct LPTV stations
Channel 60: WEON-LP - (Fox) - Frederiksted

Translators

United States Virgin Islands
Television stations